The Town of Marble is a Statutory Town in Gunnison County, Colorado, United States.  The town population was 133 at the 2020 United States Census.

History
The Town of Marble was first incorporated in 1899. Marble remains a statutory town of the State of Colorado today.

The quarry
The town is the location of a historic Yule Marble quarry along the mountains that began operations in the late 19th century, and from which the town draws its name. It has been used for the Tomb of the Unknowns, as well as for parts of the Lincoln Memorial in Washington, D.C., and civic buildings in San Francisco. It was also used for the construction of the Equitable Building, a historically important early skyscraper in New York City.

The marble of the quarry is considered to be of exceptional quality, praised as one of the purest marbles ever quarried and a rival to classical Italian and Greek marble. It is nearly pure calcite marble with minor inclusions of mica,  quartz,  and feldspar, and has irregularly shaped calcite grains ranging from 100 to 600 micrometers in diameter. According to physical tests of the marble, its strength is comparable to marble typically used in building construction.

The quarry has enjoyed a renaissance since its acquisition in 2004 by Polycor, a Canadian-based dimension stone company, and subsequent sale to Italian group R.E.D. Graniti S.p.A. In spite of significant transportation costs, this high-quality stone is now exported in large quantities to Europe and Asia for transformation and use throughout the world, as well as being sold into the US market.

Tourism
In the late 20th century and the 21st century, Marble has become a summer tourist destination. It is also the gateway to the nearby Crystal townsite. It is the site of the Marble/marble sculpting symposium held every summer since 1988.

Seven sites within Marble have been listed on the National Register of Historic Places.

 Haxby House
 William D. Parry House
 St. Paul's Church
 Marble City State Bank building
 Marble High School
 Marble Mill Site
 Marble Town Hall

Geography
Marble is located at  (39.072274, -107.189516).

The community is located in a valley of the upper Crystal River along the Elk Mountains, accessible by a paved road from State Highway 133. Unlike most of Gunnison County, the town is located on the north side of Schofield Pass which is inaccessible to most cars and thus is separated geographically from the rest of Gunnison County.

Demographics

Education
Marble Charter School (MCS) is a public, tuition-free charter school located in Marble. The school serves K-8 students in the Crystal River Valley.

See also

Outline of Colorado
Index of Colorado-related articles
State of Colorado
Colorado cities and towns
Colorado municipalities
Colorado counties
Gunnison County, Colorado
West Elk Mountains
Yule Marble

References

External links

 
 CDOT map of the Town of Marble

Towns in Gunnison County, Colorado
Towns in Colorado
Colorado Mining Boom